The WAGR N class was a class of steam locomotives operated by the Western Australian Government Railways (WAGR) from 1896 until 1960.

History
In September 1896, five Neilson & Co built N class entered service hauling suburban trains around Perth between Fremantle and Midland Junction and on the Kalgoorlie-Boulder loop. Robert Stephenson & Co built a further twelve in 1898/99 and Nasmyth, Wilson & Co a further fifteen in 1901. In 1907/08 a further ten were added, when the Midland Railway Workshops converted ten O class. With the cessation of suburban services in Kalgoorlie, all were transferred to Perth.

Most remained in service until replaced by Dm and Dd class locomotives in the 1940s and ADH class diesel multiple units in the 1950s. The last two were withdrawn in September 1960.

N201 has been preserved at the Western Australian Rail Transport Museum.

Class list
The numbers and periods in service of each member of the N class were as follows:

Namesake
The N class designation was reused in the 1970s when the N class diesel locomotives entered service.

See also

Rail transport in Western Australia
List of Western Australian locomotive classes

References

Notes

Cited works

External links

Nasmyth, Wilson and Company locomotives
Neilson locomotives
Railway locomotives introduced in 1896
Robert Stephenson and Company locomotives
N WAGR class
3 ft 6 in gauge locomotives of Australia
4-4-4T locomotives
Passenger locomotives